Douglas McDonald Orr (born 8 November 1937) was a Scottish amateur football outside left who played in the Scottish League for Queen's Park. He was capped by Scotland at amateur level and also played in the Athenian League for Hendon and the Football League for Queens Park Rangers. After his retirement as a player, he coached in college soccer in the United States with the Hartford Hawks.

Career statistics

Player

Manager

References 

Scottish footballers
Scottish Football League players
Queen's Park F.C. players
Association football outside forwards
Scotland amateur international footballers
Hendon F.C. players
Queens Park Rangers F.C. players
English Football League players
Queen's Park F.C. non-playing staff
Footballers from Glasgow
1937 births
Living people
Hartford Hawks men's soccer coaches